This was the first edition of the tournament.

Ariel Behar and Gonzalo Escobar won the title after defeating Evan King and Julian Ocleppo 6–4, 7–6(7–5) in the final.

Seeds

Draw

References

External links
 Main draw

Jerusalem Volvo Open - Doubles